Hilleste is a village in Hiiumaa Parish, Hiiu County in northwestern Estonia.

Wrestler Heiki Nabi (born 1985) was born in Hilleste.

The village is first mentioned probably in 1539 (Hilliast). Historically, the village was part of Pühalepa Church Manor.

References
 

Villages in Hiiu County